Serpneve is an urban-type settlement in Bolhrad Raion of Odesa Oblast in Ukraine. It is located on the left bank of the Cogâlnic, at the border with Moldova. Serpneve belongs to Tarutyne settlement hromada, one of the hromadas of Ukraine. Population: 

Until 18 July 2020, Serpneve belonged to Tarutyne Raion. The raion was abolished in July 2020 as part of the administrative reform of Ukraine, which reduced the number of raions of Odesa Oblast to seven. The area of Tarutyne Raion was merged into Bolhrad Raion.

Economy

Transportation
It is a terminal station on a railway line from Artsyz, which, in its turn, is a station on the railway connecting Odesa and Izmail. There is infrequent passenger traffic.

The settlement is connected by road with Artsyz, where there are further connections to Odesa. Other roads cross into Moldova.

References

Urban-type settlements in Bolhrad Raion